Straight Life is a soul/funk influenced jazz album recorded in 1970 by trumpeter Freddie Hubbard. It was recorded on 16 November 1970 and released between the albums Red Clay (1970) and First Light (1971). This is also Hubbard's eighteenth overall album.

Track listing 
"Straight Life" (Freddie Hubbard) - 17:30
"Mr. Clean" (Weldon Irvine) - 13:37
"Here's That Rainy Day" (Jimmy Van Heusen, Johnny Burke) - 5:17

Personnel 
Freddie Hubbard - trumpet, flugelhorn
Joe Henderson - tenor saxophone
Herbie Hancock - electric piano
George Benson - guitar
Ron Carter - double bass
Jack DeJohnette - drums
Richard Landrum - drums, percussion
Weldon Irvine - tambourine

References

Freddie Hubbard albums
1971 albums
Albums produced by Creed Taylor
CTI Records albums
Jazz fusion albums by American artists
Albums recorded at Van Gelder Studio